Wachu Intiyuq (Quechua wachu ridge between two furrows; row, inti sun, -yuq a suffix to indicate ownership, Hispanicized spelling Huachuintiyoc) is a mountain in the Chunta mountain range in the Andes of Peru, about  high. It lies in the Huancavelica Region, Huancavelica Province, Huancavelica District, southwest of Antarasu.

References

Mountains of Huancavelica Region
Mountains of Peru